Elina Svitolina was the defending champion, but chose to compete in Stuttgart instead.

Pauline Parmentier won the title, her first since 2008, defeating Polona Hercog in the final, 6–4, 3–6, 6–3.

Seeds

Draw

Finals

Top half

Bottom half

Qualifying

Seeds

Qualifiers

First qualifier

Second qualifier

Third qualifier

Fourth qualifier

Fifth qualifier

Sixth qualifier

References

External Links
 Main Draw
 Qualifying Draw

İstanbul Cup
2018 in Turkish tennis
Istanbul Cup - Singles
2018 in Istanbul
İstanbul